Gordon Smith may refer to:

In politics
Gordon H. Smith (born 1952), former U.S. Senator from Oregon, and current Area Authority for the LDS Church
Gordon Elsworth Smith (1918–2005), Canadian politician
Gordon Smith (academic) (1927–2009), pioneer in the study of comparative European politics

In sports
Gordon Smith (American football) (born 1939), tight end with the NFL's Minnesota Vikings during the 1960s
Gordon Smith (footballer, born 1924) (1924–2004), Scottish footballer, played for Hibernian, Heart of Midlothian, Dundee and Scotland
Gordon Smith (footballer, born July 1954) (1954–2014), Scottish footballer, played for St. Johnstone and Aston Villa
Gordon Smith (footballer, born December 1954), Scottish footballer (Rangers and Brighton & Hove Albion), former SFA chief executive
Gordon Smith (footballer, born 1991), Scottish footballer, currently with Raith Rovers, son of Gordon Smith (footballer born 1959)
Gordon Smith (ice hockey) (1908–1999), American Olympic ice hockey player
Gordon Smith (New Zealand footballer), New Zealand international football (soccer) player
Gordon Smith (rugby league), New Zealand former professional rugby league footballer
Gordon Smith (wrestler) (born 1954), Australian wrestler
Gord Smith (ice hockey) (born 1949), Canadian ice hockey player

In the arts
Gordon Smith (screenwriter), American television screenwriter
Gordon W. Smith (1920–2010), artist and collector of American Indian art
Gordon A. Smith (1919–2020), Canadian painter and sculptor who was born in England
Gord Smith (sculptor) (born 1937), Canadian sculptor
W. Gordon Smith (1928–1996), Scottish playwright, author, critic, lyricist and television producer

Other people
Gordon V. Smith (1906–1997), Episcopal bishop in the US
Gordon Smith (inventor) (1950–2006), machinist and inventor of the KISS diving Rebreather
Gordon Smith (philatelist) (1856–1905), English lawyer and philatelist
Gordon Smith (psychic medium) (born 1962), Scottish psychic medium
Gordon Smith (British Army officer) (1920–2014), Scottish WWII soldier and Japanese prisoner-of-war
Gordon "Ches" Smith, musician and percussionist

See also 
Gordon Smith Guitars, a British manufacturer of electric guitars